The 2017 Indiana Hoosiers men's soccer team was the represented Indiana University during the 2017 NCAA Division I men's soccer season. It was the Hoosiers' 45th season of varsity college soccer, and their 27th season in the Big Ten Conference.

The Hoosiers finished as runners-up for both the Big Ten regular season, the 2017 Big Ten Conference Men's Soccer Tournament, and the 2017 NCAA Division I Men's Soccer Championship. The Hoosiers only lost one match in regulation or overtime the entire season, finishing with an 18-1-6 record. It was the fewest losses the program posted in a season since 1997, when the Hoosiers finished 23-1-0, and reached the semifinals of the NCAA Tournament. It was also only the fourth time in program history the Hoosiers had only one loss on the season.

Background 
In the 2016 season Indiana tied for second in the regular season with Wisconsin. Indiana then lost to Wisconsin in semifinals of the Big Ten Tournament on penalties. Indiana was selected for an at-large bid for the NCAA Tournament, losing in the third round to Virginia Tech.

Preseason roster changes

Departures

2017 team recruits 

Ten true freshmen joined the Hoosiers ahead of the 2017 campaign. Of the 10, three of the recruits were in-state recruits and six were from the midwest region. Indiana announced their initial recruiting class on February 1, 2017. In March, recruiting class was considered the fifth-best recruiting class by CollegeSoccerNews.com. Seattle Sounders FC Academy, and Sounders U-19 goalkeeper, Trey Muse, made a late commitment to Indiana on May 4, 2017.

Review 

The Hoosiers finished the regular season with an undefeated record, being on the only program in the nation to achieve such an accomplishment. During the regular season, the Hoosiers finished 13-0-4 and 5-0-3 in conference play. They finished second in the Big Ten behind Michigan, and were seeded second in the 2017 Big Ten Conference Men's Soccer Tournament. There, the Hoosiers defeated Penn State and Ohio without giving up any goals. In the championship game, the Hoosiers faced Wisconsin, the same program that eliminated them from last year's Big Ten Tournament. After a scoreless draw, the Badgers got the better of the Hoosiers in a penalty shoot-out, giving the Badgers the Big Ten title. Despite failing to win the Big Ten title, Indiana earned an at-large berth into the NCAA Tournament, where they were given the number two-overall seed. This afforded the Hoosiers a first-round bye, where they hosted the winner of the Old Dominion (2017 Conference USA Men's Soccer Tournament champions) vs. NC State (ACC 9th-place finishers) match in the second round. Old Dominion won the match 2-0, meaning the Hoosiers hosted the Monarchs in Bloomington on November 19, in the second round. Goals from Lillard, Toye and Panchot were enough for Indiana, as they cruised to a 3-0 win over Old Dominion.

In the third round, or "sweet sixteen" of the tournament, Indiana hosted the 20th-ranked, New Hampshire (2017 America East Men's Soccer Tournament semifinalists). Thomas opened the scoring for the Hoosiers in the 10th minute, while Moore scored the game-winning goal in the 65th minute, giving Indiana a 2-0 lead over New Hampshire. The Wildcat's Jacob Gould would notch one back in the 76th minute, creating a nervy final quarter hour for the Hoosiers. Despite this, Indiana would hold on to win the match, and advance to their 25th NCAA quarterfinal ("elite eight") and their first since their national championship run in 2012. In the quarterfinals, Indiana was pitted against their conference foes, the seventh-seed, Michigan State. The match, played at Bill Armstrong Stadium in Bloomington was sold out, with a capacity crowd of 5,450 on hand. In the match, the Spartans would score a stunning 2nd-minute goal to put the Hoosiers in an early hole. Michigan State left winger, Ken Krolicki served a cross to Ryan Sierakowski who headed it in the bottom left corner. It was Ryan Sierakowski's ninth goal of the season. The Spartans would hold on to the lead through the first half and through a third of the second half of play. In the 60th minute, Indiana's Swartz headed an inswinging corner kick to tie the match, 1-1. The score would remain gridlocked through the remainder of regulation and the two overtime periods. In penalty kicks, Indiana prevailed over Michigan State, 3-2, giving the Hoosiers their 19th College Cup appearance.

In the national semifinals, Indiana took on a familiar college soccer powerhouse, North Carolina. The cagey match featured a lone goal from Gutman, who scored off a loose ball in the penalty box off a deflected corner kick. The 50th-minute goal from Gutman was the lone goal of the match and enough to send Indiana to its 15th NCAA Division I Men's Soccer Championship Game.

Roster

Competitions

Regular season

Big Ten Tournament

NCAA Tournament

Rankings

National rankings

Regional rankings

Statistics

Competitions table

Appearances and goals 

|-
! colspan="12" style="background:#dcdcdc; text-align:center"| Goalkeepers

|-
! colspan="12" style="background:#dcdcdc; text-align:center"| Defenders

|-
! colspan="12" style="background:#dcdcdc; text-align:center"| Midfielders
   

|-
! colspan="12" style="background:#dcdcdc; text-align:center"| Forwards
|-

|}

See also 
2017 Big Ten Conference men's soccer season
2017 Big Ten Conference Men's Soccer Tournament
2017 NCAA Division I Men's Soccer Championship

References 

Indiana Hoosiers
Indiana Hoosiers men's soccer seasons
Indiana Hoosiers, Soccer
Indiana Hoosiers
Indiana Hoosiers
NCAA Division I Men's Soccer Tournament College Cup seasons